No More Nice Girls is the third studio album from Hang on the Box. It was released on September 27, 2007 in China.

Track listing

Personnel 

Wang Yue – Vocals
Yang Fan – Guitar
Yilina – Bass
Shen Jing – Drums

References
Import China Version
Extracts on MySpace.com

2007 albums
Hang on the Box albums